Western Holiday is an Australian television series which aired in 1960 on Melbourne station HSV-7. The live variety series aired on 8 January, 15 January, and 22 January. The cast included Freddie and Pam Bamberger, Jackie Clancy, and Ted Zeigler.

References

External links
Western Holiday on IMDb

1960 Australian television series debuts
1960 Australian television series endings
Black-and-white Australian television shows
English-language television shows
Australian variety television shows